A patent application is a request pending at a patent office for the grant of a patent for an invention described in the patent specification and a set of one or more claims stated in a formal document, including necessary official forms and related correspondence. It is the combination of the document and its processing within the administrative and legal framework of the patent office.

To obtain the grant of a patent, a person, either legal or natural, must file an application at a patent office with the jurisdiction to grant a patent in the geographic area over which coverage is required. This is often a national patent office, but may be a regional body, such as the European Patent Office. Once the patent specification complies with the laws of the office concerned, a patent may be granted for the invention described and claimed by the specification.

The process of "negotiating" or "arguing" with a patent office for the grant of a patent, and interaction with a patent office with regard to a patent after its grant, is known as patent prosecution. Patent prosecution is distinct from patent litigation which relates to legal proceedings for infringement of a patent after it is granted.

Definition 
The term patent application refers to the legal and administrative proceedings of requesting the issuance of a patent for an invention, as well as to the physical document and content of the description and claims of the invention, including its procedural paper work.

The first of those—the request for a legal privilege to which the applicant is entitled if the application is well founded—is temporal by its nature. It ceases to exist as soon as the application is withdrawn or refused, or a patent is granted. The informational content of the document as filed (or in other, prosaic words, the piece of paper), is a historical fact that persists and exists in perpetuity. The expression "application" is often employed without being conscious of its ambiguity. The expression is capable of misleading even experienced professionals.

Geographic scope
Depending upon the office at which a patent application is filed, that application could either be an application for a patent in a given country, or may be an application for a patent in a range of countries. The former are known as "national (patent) applications", and the latter as "regional (patent) applications".

National applications
National applications are generally filed at a national patent office, such as the United Kingdom Patent Office, to obtain a patent in the country of that office. The application may either be filed directly at that office, or may result from a regional application or from an international application under the Patent Cooperation Treaty (PCT), once it enters the national phase.

Regional applications
A regional patent application is one which may have effect in a range of countries. The European Patent Office (EPO) is an example of a Regional patent office. The EPO grants patents which can take effect in some or all countries contracting to the European Patent Convention (EPC), following a single application process.

Filing and prosecuting an application at a regional granting office is advantageous as it allows patents in a number of countries to be obtained without having to prosecute applications in all of those countries. The cost and complexity of obtaining protection is therefore reduced.

International applications
The Patent Cooperation Treaty (PCT) is operated by World Intellectual Property Organization (WIPO) and provides a centralised application process, but patents are not granted under the treaty. 

The PCT system enables an applicant to file a single patent application in a single language. The application, called an international application, can, at a later date, lead to the grant of a patent in any of the states contracting to the PCT. WIPO, or more precisely the International Bureau of WIPO, performs many of the formalities of a patent application in a centralised manner, therefore avoiding the need to repeat the steps in all countries in which a patent may ultimately be granted. The WIPO coordinates searches performed by any one of the International Searching Authorities (ISA), publishes the international applications and coordinates preliminary examination performed by any one of the International Preliminary Examination Authorities (IPEA). Steps such as naming inventors and applicants, and filing certified copies of priority documents can also be done centrally, and need not be repeated.

The main advantage of proceeding via the PCT route is that the option of obtaining patents in a wide range of countries is retained, while the cost of a large number of applications is deferred. In most countries, if a national application succeeds, damages can be claimed from the date of the international application's publication.

Types
Patent offices may define a number of types of applications, each offering different benefits and being useful in different situations. Each office utilizes different names for the types of applications, but the general groups are detailed below.  Within each group there are specific type of applications, such as patents for inventions (also called "utility patents" in the U.S.), plant patents, and design patents, each of which can have their own substantive and procedural rules.

Standard application
A standard patent application is a patent application containing all of the necessary parts (e.g. a written description of the invention and claims) that are required for the grant of a patent.  A standard patent application may or may not result in the grant of a patent depending upon the outcome of an examination by the patent office it is filed in. In the U.S., a standard patent application is referred to as a "non-provisional" application.

Provisional application
Provisional patent applications can be filed at a small number of patent offices, such as the USPTO in the U.S. A provisional application provides an opportunity to place an application on file to obtain a filing date (thereby securing a priority date), but without the expense and complexity of a standard patent application. The disclosure in a provisional application may, within a limited time (one year in the U.S.), be incorporated into a standard patent application if a patent is to be pursued.  Otherwise, the provisional application expires.  No enforceable rights can be obtained solely through the filing of a provisional application.

Continuation application
In certain offices a patent application can be filed as a continuation of a previous application. Such an application is a convenient method of including material from a previous application in a new application when the priority year has expired and further refinement is needed. Various types of continuation application are possible, such as continuation and continuation-in-part.

Divisional application
A divisional patent application is one which has been "divided" from an existing application. A divisional application can only contain subject matter in the application from which it is divided (its parent), and retains the filing and priority date of the parent. Divisional applications are useful if a unity of invention objection is issued, in which case further inventions can be protected in divisional applications.

Preparation, filing, and prosecution

The process of obtaining the grant of a patent begins with the preparation of a specification describing the invention. That specification is filed at a patent office for examination and ultimately a patent for the invention described in the application is either granted or refused.

Patent specification
A patent specification is a document describing the invention for which a patent is sought and setting out the scope of the protection of the patent. As such, a specification generally contains a section detailing the background and overview of the invention, a description of the invention and embodiments of the invention and claims, which set out the scope of the protection. A specification may include figures to aid the description of the invention, gene sequences and references to biological deposits, or computer code, depending upon the subject matter of the application. Most patent offices also require that the application includes an abstract which provides a summary of the invention to aid searching. A title must also generally be provided for the application. 

Each patent office has rules relating to the form of the specification, defining such things as paper size, font, layout, section ordering and headings. Such requirements vary between offices.

Since a description cannot generally be modified once it is filed (with narrow exceptions), it is important to have it done correctly the first time.

Claims
The claims of a patent specification define the scope of protection granted by the patent. The claims describe the invention in a specific legal style, setting out the essential features of the invention in a manner to clearly define what would infringe the patent. Claims are often amended during prosecution to narrow or expand their scope.

The claims may contain one or more hierarchical sets of claims, each having one or more main, independent claim setting out the broadest protection, and a number of dependent claims which narrow that protection by defining more specific features of the invention.

In the U.S., claims can be amended after a patent is granted, but their scope cannot be broadened beyond what was originally disclosed in the specification.  No claim broadening is allowed more than two years after the patent issues.

Filing date
The filing date of an application sets a cutoff date after which any public disclosures cannot form prior art (but the priority date must also be considered), and also because, in most jurisdictions, the right to a patent for an invention lies with the first person to file an application for protection of that invention (See: first to file and first to invent). It is therefore generally beneficial to file an application as soon as possible.

To obtain a filing date, the documents filed must comply with the regulations of the patent office in which it was filed. A full specification complying with all rules may not be required to obtain a filing date. For example, in the U.K., claims and an abstract are not required to obtain a filing date, but can be added later. However, since no subject matter can be added to an application after the filing date, it is important that an application disclose all material relevant to the application at the time of filing. If the requirements for the award of a filing date are not met, the patent office notifies the applicant of the deficiencies. Depending upon the law of the patent office in question, correction may be possible without moving the filing date, or the application may be awarded a filing date adjusted to the date on which the requirements are completed. A filed application generally receives an application number.

Priority claim
A patent application may claim priority from one or more previously filed applications to take advantage of the filing date of these earlier applications (in respect of the information contained in these earlier applications). Claiming priority is desirable because the earlier effective filing date reduces the number of prior art disclosures, increasing the likelihood of obtaining a patent.

The priority system is useful in filing patent applications in many countries, as the cost of the filings can be delayed by up to a year, without any of the applications made earlier for the same invention counting against later applications.

The rules relating to priority claims are in accordance with the Paris Convention for the Protection of Industrial Property, and countries which provide a priority system in conformity with the Paris Convention are said to be convention countries. These rules should not be confused with the rules under the Patent Cooperation Treaty (PCT), outlined above.

Security issues
Many national patent offices require that security clearance is given prior to the filing of a patent application in foreign countries. Such clearance is intended to protect national security by preventing the spread and publication of technologies related to (amongst others) warfare or nuclear arms. 

The rules vary between patent offices, but in general all applications filed are reviewed and if they contain any relevant material, a secrecy order may be imposed. That order may prevent the publication of the application, and/or the foreign filing of patents relating to the invention.

Should it be desired to file an application in a country other than an inventor's country of residence, it may be necessary to obtain a foreign filing licence from the inventor's national patent office to permit filing abroad. Some offices, such as the USPTO, may grant an automatic license after a specified time (e.g., 6 months), if a secrecy order is not issued in that time.

Publication
Patent applications are generally published 18 months after the earliest priority date of the application. Prior to that publication the application is confidential to the patent office. After publication, depending upon local rules, certain parts of the application file may remain confidential, but it is common for all communications between an Applicant (or his agent) and the patent office to be publicly available.

The publication of a patent application marks the date at which it is publicly available and therefore at which it forms full prior art for other patent applications worldwide.

Patent pending
The expression patent pending is a warning that an alleged invention is the subject of a patent application. The term may be used to mark products containing the invention to alert a third party to the fact that the third party may be infringing a patent if the product is copied after the patent is granted. The rules on the use of the term to mark products vary among patent offices, as do the benefits of such marking. In general, it is permissible to apply the term patent pending to a product if there is, in fact, a patent pending for any invention implemented in the product.

Patentable subject matter

Patents are granted for the protection of an invention, but while an invention may occur in any field, patent laws have restrictions on the areas in which patents can be granted. Such restrictions are known as exclusions from patentability.

The scope of patentable subject is significantly larger in the U.S. than in Europe. For example, in Europe, things such as computer software or methods of performing mental acts are not patentable. The subject of what should be patentable is highly contentious, particularly as to software and business methods.

Search and examination

After filing, either systematically or, in some jurisdictions, upon request, a search is carried out for the patent application. The purpose of the search is to reveal prior art which may be relevant to the patentability of the alleged invention (that is, relevant to what is claimed, the "claimed subject-matter"). The search report is published, generally with the application 18 months after the priority date of the application, and as such is a public document. The search report is useful to the applicant to determine whether the application should be pursued or if there is prior art which prevents the grant of a useful patent, in which case the application may be abandoned before the applicant incurs further expense. The search report is also useful for the public and the competitors, so that they may have an idea of the scope of protection which may be granted to the pending patent application.

In some jurisdictions, including the U.S., a separate search is not conducted, but rather search and examination are combined. In such case, a separate search report is not issued, and it is not until the application is examined that the applicant is informed of prior art which the patent office examiner considers relevant.

Examination is the process of ensuring that an application complies with the requirements of the relevant patent laws. Examination is generally an iterative process, whereby the patent office notifies the applicant of its objection (see Office action). The applicant may respond with an argument or an amendment to overcome the objection.  The amendment and the argument may then be accepted or rejected, triggering further response, and so forth, until a patent is issued or the application is abandoned or refused. Because patent application examination may be a lengthy process, many patent offices including United States Patent and Trademark Office (USPTO) and other national patent offices have introduced several programs of prioritized examination. These programs targeted specific domains or small firms. Post-program studies have found that small firms (less than 500 employees) are almost 4 times more likely than large firms to apply for accelerated examination the prioritized patenting, moreover patents examined through the Track One Program at USPTO were up to 44% more likely to be cited.

Issue or grant
Once the patent application complies with the requirements of the relevant patent office, a patent is granted further official fees, and in some regional patent systems, such as the European patent system, validating the patent requires that the applicant provide translations of the application in the official languages of states in which they desire protection. 

The date of issue effectively terminates prosecution of a specific application, after which continuing applications cannot be filed, and establishes the date upon which infringement may be charged.  Furthermore, an issue date for an application in the U.S. filed prior to 1995 also factors into the term of the patent, whereas the term of later filings is determined solely by the filing date.

Post-issue or grant
Many jurisdictions require periodic payment of maintenance fees to retain the validity of a patent after it is issued and during its term. Failure to timely pay the fees results in loss of the patent's protection.

The validity of an issued patent may also be subject to post-issue challenges of various types, some of which may cause the patent office to re-examine the application.

Trends in patents applications

In 2020, 3.3 million patent applications were filed worldwide. This represents an increase of 1.6% on 2019.

Note: World totals are WIPO estimates using data covering 161 patent offices. These totals include applications filed directly with national and regional offices and applications entering offices through the Patent Cooperation Treaty national phase (where applicable). China’s pre-2017 data are not comparable due to a change in methodology. Due to this break in the data series, and to the high number of filings in China, it is not possible to report an accurate 2017 growth rate at world level.

In 2020, women accounted for 16.5% of all inventors listed in Patent Cooperation Treaty applications and men the remaining 83.5%. The proportion of women inventors has increased from 11.3% in 2006 to 16.5% in 2020. Moreover, the proportion of women inventors has grown in every region of the world over the past decade. About 33.7% of PCT applications named at least one woman as inventor in 2020, and 95.9% named at least one man as inventor. The share of PCT applications with at least one woman as inventor has risen from 22% in 2006 to 33.7% in 2020, while the share for those with at least one man as inventor has decreased within the same period, from 97.3% down to 95.9%.

The gender gap among PCT inventors varies considerably across countries. Within the top 20 origins, Spain (27.2%), China (22.4%) and the Republic of Korea (20.5%) had the largest proportion of inventors who were women in 2020. Conversely, Germany (10.8%), Japan (10.4%) and Austria (8.1%) had the smallest.

Fields of technology related to the life sciences had comparatively high shares of PCT applications with women inventors in 2020. Women represented more than one-quarter of inventors listed in published PCT applications in the fields of biotechnology (29.5%), food chemistry (29.4%), pharmaceuticals (28.6%), analysis of biological materials (25.9%) and organic fine chemistry (25.2%).

Components
A patent application generally contains a description of the invention and at least one claim purporting to define it. A patent application may also include drawings to illustrate the invention. Furthermore, an abstract is generally required. 

For example, an international (PCT) application "must contain the following elements:  request, description, claim or claims, one or more drawings (where drawings are necessary for the understanding of the invention), and abstract."  specifies what the description of an international application should contain in more details.

As another example, a European patent application consists of "a request for the grant of a European patent, a description of the invention, one or more claims, any drawings referred to in the description or claims, and an abstract."  specifies what the description of a European patent application should contain in more details.

See also 
 Backlog of unexamined patent applications
 INID codes
 Kokai
 Glossary of patent law terms
 List of patent offices
 Patent caveat, a type of provisional application used by the USPTO until 1909
 Patent model, a miniature model of an invention required by the USPTO until 1880
 Proof of concept
 Provisional rights
 Statutory invention registration

Notes

Sources

References

Further reading 

 Eugenio Archontopoulos, Dominique Guellec, Niels Stevnsborg, Bruno van Pottelsberghe de la Potterie, Nicolas van Zeebroeck, When small is beautiful: measuring the evolution and consequences of the voluminosity of patent applications at the EPO , 2006, No 06-019.RS, Working Papers CEB from Université Libre de Bruxelles, Solvay Business School, Centre Emile Bernheim (CEB) (pdf)

Application, patent